Robert Sabino is an American rock keyboardist.  He was born and raised in the Bronx.  Although classically trained, he became a rock performer.

In 1975 Sabino became a professional composer and session keyboardist, most notably recording and touring with artists such as Bryan Adams, Laurie Anderson, Ashford & Simpson, Philip Bailey, Jeff Beck, David Bowie, Kim Carnes, Rosanne Cash, Chic, Rodney Crowell, Peter Frampton, Ace Frehley (Kiss), Art Garfunkel, Herbie Hancock, Debbie Harry, Warren Haynes (Allman Brothers Band), Mick Jagger, Mick Jones, Madonna, Johnny Mathis, Tim Moore, Odyssey, Teddy Pendergrass, Power Station, Diana Ross, Todd Rundgren, John Sebastian, Nick Seeger, Charlie Sexton, Jules Shear, The Simms Brothers Band,  Carly Simon, Paul Simon, Simon and Garfunkel, Sister Sledge, Chris Spedding, Fonzi Thornton, Tin Huey, and Steve Winwood. He was also a permanent member of the disco group Chic, playing on such records as "Dance Dance Dance" and "Le Freak". He also played on such records Sister Sledge's "We Are Family" and playing keyboard and synth on Madonna's Like a Virgin album.  

Throughout the 1980s he toured and wrote songs for these musicians. He wrote songs for the Care Bears soundtrack with John Sebastian, and wrote tracks for Peter Frampton. He last toured with Todd Rundgren.

Sabino is the musical director of his local church, Holy Trinity Parish, and teaches a rock history class at UC Davis. He also teaches both kids and adults choir at Holy Trinity School while teaching about music and doing liturgical band.

References

American rock keyboardists
Chic (band) members
Living people
People from the Bronx
Year of birth missing (living people)
Musicians from New York City